Wine Psi Phi is an African American fraternity.  It was founded in 1959 under the name HUMS at Howard University and had the motto of We Initiate New Experiences   In 1962 the name was changed to W.I.N.E. Psi Phi. It arose out of the social activism of the 1960s during the Civil Rights Movement.   It also came about as an alternative to many traditional black Greek letter organizations.  Wine Psi Phi was known for its ability to control student parliament.  Wine Psi Phi was known for its performance in step shows. In 1975, pledge Richard A. Gowins died at Northern Illinois University, as a result of alcohol poisoning. In 1979 at Virginia State University one pledge Robert Etheridge died as a result of drowning.

Chapter List
Wine Psi Phi chapters include:
Howard University -1959
Bluefield State College
Cheyney University of Pennsylvania -1967
Lincoln University (Pennsylvania)- 1968.
Delaware State University - 1972. 
Kittrell College - 1969 (founded 1969, incorporated May 8, 1973 changed the colors of Wine to Burgundy and White)
Florida A&M University
Elizabeth City State University
South Carolina State University
North Carolina Central University
Fayetteville State University
Virginia State University
Benedict College
Morris College
Boston College
Saint Augustine's University
Shaw University
Morgan State University
Virginia State University
University of Wisconsin - Stevens Point
Northern Illinois University
Southern University at Baton Rouge
University of Illinois
Lewis University - 1973 - Akadama Plum chapter 
Illinois State University
Southern Illinois University
Bradley University
Eureka College
Illinois Benedictine College
Chicago State University
Morehouse College
Eastern Illinois University

References

Student organizations established in 1962
Fraternities and sororities in the United States
African-American fraternities and sororities
1962 establishments in Washington, D.C.